Fargesia is a genus of flowering plants in the grass family. These bamboos are native primarily to China, with a few species in Vietnam and in the eastern Himalayas. Some species are cultivated as ornamentals, with common names including umbrella bamboo and fountain bamboo.

They are medium to small mountain clumping bamboos, native to alpine conifer forests of East Asia, from China south to Vietnam and west to the eastern slopes of the Himalayas. They are known in Chinese as jian zhu, meaning  "arrow bamboo".

The scientific name was given in honour of the French missionary and amateur botanist Père Paul Guillaume Farges (1844–1912).

Fargesias are some of the world's hardiest bamboos, but they do not spread vigorously.  Common bamboos in the genus Fargesia are essential foods for giant pandas, and large-scale flowering of its species has had a devastating effect on panda populations. Giant panda habitat will therefore need at least two species of Fargesia, to ensure food supply during flowering events.

Because fargesias are becoming more well known for their thick clumping habits, they have become cheaper and available at many nurseries.

Taxonomy 
There are currently about 80–90 recognised species, but morphological and genetic analysis suggest transferring many of these to the genera Thamnocalamus, Yushania and Borinda. Others are still of unknown relationship. 
, Plants of the World Online accepts the following species:

Fargesia acuticontracta T.P.Yi
Fargesia adpressa T.P.Yi
Fargesia alatovaginata T.P.Yi & J.Y.Shi
Fargesia albocerea Hsueh & T.P.Yi
Fargesia altior T.P.Yi
Fargesia angustissima T.P.Yi
Fargesia apicirubens Stapleton
Fargesia brevipes (McClure) T.P.Yi
Fargesia brevissima T.P.Yi
Fargesia caduca T.P.Yi
Fargesia canaliculata T.P.Yi
Fargesia circinata Hsueh & T.P.Yi
Fargesia communis T.P.Yi
Fargesia concinna T.P.Yi
Fargesia conferta T.P.Yi
Fargesia contracta T.P.Yi
Fargesia cuspidata (Keng) Z.P.Wang & G.H.Ye
Fargesia daminiu T.P.Yi & J.Y.Shi
Fargesia declivis T.P.Yi
Fargesia decurvata J.L.Lu
Fargesia denudata T.P.Yi
Fargesia dracocephala T.P.Yi
Fargesia dulcicula T.P.Yi
Fargesia dura T.P.Yi
Fargesia edulis Hsueh & T.P.Yi
Fargesia elegans T.P.Yi
Fargesia exposita T.P.Yi
Fargesia extensa T.P.Yi
Fargesia fansipanensis T.Q.Nguyen
Fargesia farcta T.P.Yi
Fargesia ferax (Keng) T.P.Yi
Fargesia frigidis T.P.Yi
Fargesia fungosa T.P.Yi
Fargesia funiushanensis T.P.Yi
Fargesia glabrifolia T.P.Yi
Fargesia gongshanensis T.P.Yi
Fargesia grossa T.P.Yi
Fargesia hackelii Ohrnb.
Fargesia hainanensis T.P.Yi
Fargesia hsuehiana T.P.Yi
Fargesia hygrophila Hsueh & T.P.Yi
Fargesia jiulongensis T.P.Yi
Fargesia lincangensis T.P.Yi
Fargesia longiuscula (Hsueh f. & Y.Y.Dai) Ohrnb.
Fargesia lushuiensis Hsueh & T.P.Yi
Fargesia macclureana (Bor) Stapleton
Fargesia mairei (Hack. ex Hand.-Mazz.) T.P.Yi
Fargesia mali T.P.Yi
Fargesia melanostachys (Hand.-Mazz.) T.P.Yi
Fargesia microauriculata M.S.Sun, D.Z.Li & H.Q.Yang
Fargesia murielae (Gamble) T.P.Yi
Fargesia nitida (Mitford) Keng f. ex T.P.Yi
Fargesia nivalis T.P.Yi & J.Y.Shi
Fargesia nujiangensis Hsueh & C.M.Hui
Fargesia obliqua T.P.Yi
Fargesia orbiculata T.P.Yi
Fargesia papyrifera T.P.Yi
Fargesia pauciflora (Keng) T.P.Yi
Fargesia perlonga Hsueh & T.P.Yi
Fargesia pleniculmis (Hand.-Mazz.) T.P.Yi
Fargesia plurisetosa T.H.Wen
Fargesia porphyrea T.P.Yi
Fargesia praecipua T.P.Yi
Fargesia qinlingensis T.P.Yi & J.X.Shao
Fargesia robusta T.P.Yi
Fargesia rufa T.P.Yi
Fargesia sagittatinea T.P.Yi
Fargesia scabrida T.P.Yi
Fargesia semicoriacea T.P.Yi
Fargesia similaris Hsueh & T.P.Yi
Fargesia solida T.P.Yi
Fargesia spathacea Franch.
Fargesia stenoclada T.P.Yi
Fargesia strigosa T.P.Yi
Fargesia subflexuosa T.P.Yi
Fargesia sylvestris T.P.Yi
Fargesia tengchongensis (Hsueh & C.M.Hui) T.P.Yi
Fargesia tenuilignea T.P.Yi
Fargesia ungulata T.H.Wen
Fargesia utilis T.P.Yi
Fargesia vicina (Keng) T.P.Yi
Fargesia weiningensis T.P.Yi & Lin Yang
Fargesia wuliangshanensis T.P.Yi
Fargesia yajiangensis T.P.Yi & J.Y.Shi
Fargesia yuanjiangensis Hsueh & T.P.Yi
Fargesia yulongshanensis T.P.Yi
Fargesia yunnanensis Hsueh & T.P.Yi
Fargesia zayuensis T.P.Yi

References

External links 

 
Bambusoideae genera
Taxa named by Adrien René Franchet